The 2001 season was Shimizu S-Pulse's tenth season in existence and their ninth season in the J1 League. The club also competed in the Emperor's Cup and the J.League Cup. The team finished the season fourth in the league and won the Emperor's Cup.

Competitions

Domestic results

J.League 1

Emperor's Cup

J.League Cup

International results

Asian Cup Winners' Cup
Shimizu S-Pulse qualified for this tournament as the defending champions.
Second Round

Quarterfinals

Final Four

Player statistics

Other pages
 J.League official site

Shimizu S-Pulse
Shimizu S-Pulse seasons